Omar Racim (1884–1959) was an Algerian artist who founded the Algerian school of miniature painting in 1939, alongside his brother Mohammed Racim. Racim also founded the nationalist journals Al Djazair in 1908, Al Farouq in 1913, and Dhou El Fikar in 1913.

Biography
Racim was born in 1884 into a distinguished family of artists of Turkish descent whose pre-colonial prosperity had been undermined by the French regime's confiscation of property. After his studies, and a year passed in Madrasa Thaalibia, Racim worked in the family workshop which his father had re-established as a wood-carving and copper-working workshop in the Casbah of Algiers where he engraved decorated tombstones. The Racim family won commissions for decorating public buildings and the pavilions of French colonial exhibitions.

A renowned calligrapher, Racim also devoted himself to a life of religion and politics. In 1907 he wrote the Mus'haf of the Thaalibia Quran. In 1912 he made a trip to Egypt and Syria, bringing back with him various Quran's and specimens of Arabic illumination. By 1913 he was publishing papers on politics, and during World War I was arrested by the French security for his political activities; initially banished, and then condemned to prison.

Released from prison on 21 September 1921, he began to focus his activities in the field of applied arts and traveled to Tunisia, Morocco, Egypt and France. Alongside his brother, Mohammed Racim, they were included in the Algerian hall of the Pavillon de l'Afrique du nord as exponents of the art of miniature. Victor Barrucand mentioned that: "The beautiful ornamented inscriptions of Omar Racim leave those of the other sections far behind. In them the artist is able to enclose the mystery of thought in the elegance of the arabesque".

After his death in 1959, he was buried in the Thaalibia Cemetery of the Casbah of Algiers.

References

Bibliography

.
.
.

1884 births
1959 deaths
Algerian calligraphers
Algerian writers
Algerian people of Turkish descent
Algerian artists
Turkish artists
People from Algiers
20th-century Algerian painters
20th-century calligraphers